Drift is the first studio album by American electronic musician Nosaj Thing. It was released on June 9, 2009. A remix of the album, titled Drift (Remixed), was released on November 2, 2010.

Critical reception
At Metacritic, which assigns a weighted average score out of 100 to reviews from mainstream critics, Drift received an average score of 83 based on 7 reviews, indicating "universal acclaim".

Mosi Reeves of Spin said, "Nosaj's remarkable, entrancing debut album gathers sundry influences, from U.K. dubstep to Aphex Twin-styled IDM, into a 36-minute computerized symphony." Shawn Reynaldo of XLR8R gave the album an 8 out of 10, saying: "Settling somewhere between Flying Lotus' otherworldly jazz and The Glitch Mob's crunked-up floor-fillers, Drift is an impeccably produced record that sounds amazing in headphones but also has enough bump to hit the dancefloor every now and then."

Track listing

References

External links
 

2009 debut albums
Nosaj Thing albums
Alpha Pup Records albums